Kamarian "KJ" Williams (born September 3, 1999) is an American college basketball player for the LSU Tigers of the Southeastern Conference (SEC). He previously played for the Murray State Racers.

High school career
Williams began his high school career at East Side High School in Cleveland, Mississippi. As a junior, he helped the Trojans finish 22–12 and advance to the 3A State Basketball Championship game. Following his junior season, Williams entered Cleveland Central High School after it was formed by the merger of East Side and Cleveland High School. As a senior, he posted a triple-double of 21 points, 12 rebounds and 10 blocks against Gentry High School and had a 27 point and 28 rebound game against West Tallahatchie High School. Williams averaged 21 points and 11 rebounds per game and helped the Wolves to a 22–9 record and a berth in the second round of the 5A State Basketball Playoffs. In February 2018, Williams committed to playing college basketball for Murray State, choosing the Racers over offers from Western Kentucky and Southeastern Louisiana.

College career
As a freshman, Williams averaged 7.6 points and 4.7 rebounds per game. He set the Murray State single-season field goal percentage record during his freshman season, connecting on 69 percent of his field goal attempts. Following the season, he focused on improving his conditioning and adding to his mid-range game. Williams averaged 12.7 points and 7.3 rebounds per game as a sophomore, and was named to the First Team All-Ohio Valley Conference (OVC). As a junior, Williams averaged 15.6 points and 8.5 rebounds per game. He repeated as a First Team All-OVC selection. On November 9, 2021, Williams scored 32 points in a 109–77 win against Cumberland. On February 10, 2022, he scored a career-high 39 points in a 73–62 win against Tennessee State. Williams had 30 points on 12-for-19 shooting and five rebounds on February 24, in a 76–43 win over Belmont to claim the OVC regular season title.

At the close of the 2021–22 season, Williams was named first-team All-OVC for the third consecutive year, as well as OVC Player of the Year. As a senior, he averaged 18 points, 8.4 rebounds and 1.4 steals per game.

On March 24, 2022, Williams declared for the 2022 NBA draft while maintaining his college eligibility and entered the transfer portal. On May 5, 2022, he transferred to LSU for his final season of eligibility, following coach Matt McMahon from Murray State. Williams scored 16 points in a 77–56 loss to Tennessee on January 21, 2023, and passed the 2,000-point mark.

Career statistics

College

|-
| style="text-align:left;"| 2018–19
| style="text-align:left;"| Murray State
| 32 || 22 || 18.2 || .698 || .200 || .526 || 4.7 || .5 || .6 || .6 || 7.6
|-
| style="text-align:left;"| 2019–20
| style="text-align:left;"| Murray State
| 32 || 8 || 23.4 || .544 || .360 || .670 || 7.3 || 1.0 || 1.1 || .7 || 12.7
|-
| style="text-align:left;"| 2020–21
| style="text-align:left;"| Murray State
| 26 || 26 || 28.7 || .567 || .413 || .667 || 8.5 || 1.0 || 1.0 || .6 || 15.6
|-
| style="text-align:left;"| 2021–22
| style="text-align:left;"| Murray State
| 34 || 34 || 29.0 || .538 || .327 || .699 || 8.4 || .7 || 1.4 || .6 || 18.0
|- class="sortbottom"
| style="text-align:center;" colspan="2"| Career
| 124 || 90 || 24.7 || .568 || .355 || .664 || 7.2 || .8 || 1.0 || .6 || 13.4

Personal life
Williams is the son of Amie Williams, who played basketball at East Side High School, leading the team to the 1999 4A State Title game before playing collegiately at Jackson State, and LaMarcus Smith

See also
 List of NCAA Division I men's basketball players with 2,000 points and 1,000 rebounds

References

External links
Murray State Racers bio

1999 births
Living people
American men's basketball players
Basketball players from Mississippi
LSU Tigers basketball players
Murray State Racers men's basketball players
People from Cleveland, Mississippi
Power forwards (basketball)